Critical Reviews in Toxicology is a peer-reviewed medical journal that publishes review articles on all aspects of toxicology. It is published by Taylor & Francis and the editor-in-chief is Roger O. McClellan. It was established in 1971 as CRC Critical Reviews in Toxicology, obtaining its current name in 1980.

Conflicts of interest 

The journal has been accused by critics of being a "broker of junk science", according to the Center for Public Integrity. Monsanto was found to have worked with an outside consulting firm to induce the journal to publish a biased review of the health effects of its product "Roundup".

Abstracting and indexing
The journal is abstracted and indexed in:

According to the Journal Citation Reports, the journal has a 2017 impact factor of 5.313.

References

External links

Publications established in 1971
Toxicology journals
Taylor & Francis academic journals
English-language journals